Jearld Baylis (born August 12, 1962) is a former star defensive lineman in the Canadian Football League.

Baylis played college football at University of Southern Mississippi., where he was known as the Space Ghost. He had a 10-year career from 1986 to 1995 for four teams. He won the CFL's Most Outstanding Defensive Player Award in 1993 and was a CFL All-Star four times. He was a part of the Baltimore Stallions 1995 Grey Cup winning team.

References

1962 births
African-American players of Canadian football
American players of Canadian football
Baltimore Stallions players
BC Lions players
Canadian football defensive linemen
Canadian Football League Most Outstanding Defensive Player Award winners
Living people
Saskatchewan Roughriders players
Southern Miss Golden Eagles football players
Players of Canadian football from Jackson, Mississippi
Players of American football from Jackson, Mississippi
Toronto Argonauts players
21st-century African-American people
20th-century African-American sportspeople